The Scent of Rain in the Balkans ( / ) is a Serbian television series, adapted from the 1986 novel of the same name by Gordana Kuić. Consisting of fourteen episodes, it was directed by actor, director and producer Ljubiša Samardžić, and produced by his wife Mirjana. The series was broadcast on the RTS1 once in a week from 11 December 2010 to 11 March 2011. The Scent of Rain in the Balkans was filmed in Belgrade, Sarajevo, Zagreb and Dubrovnik.

The sequel to the series, The Blossom of Linden in the Balkans, is expected to be premiered in 2011.

Plot

Cast and characters 

 Mirka Vasiljević as Blanka "Blanki" Salom
 Aleksandra Bibić as Rifketa "Riki" Salom
 Kalina Kovačević as Nina Salom
 Tamara Dragičević as Laura "Buka" Salom
 Marija Vicković as Klara Salom
 Stefan Buzurović as Isak "Atleta" Salom
 Ljiljana Blagojević as Estera Salom
 Predrag Ejdus as Leon Salom
 Siniša Ubović as Marko Korać
 Goran Navojec as Škoro "Ignjo" Ignjatić
 Igor Damjanović as Miloš Ranković
 Milan Vasić as Danijel Papo
 Stipe Kostanić as Ivo Valić
 Srđan Karanović as Vladeta Dragutinović
 Dragan Petrović as David
 Aleksandra Alač as Didi Valić
 Jelisaveta Seka Sabljić as Nona Salom

Differences from the novel 
 In the series, there is an elderly Blanki as a narrator.
 In the novel, Leon and Estera have seven children, five daughters (Buka, Nina, Klara, Blanki and Riki) and two sons (Isak and Elijas). However, the character of Elijas was written out of the series.
 In the novel, Buka was in love with Danijel when she married him. In the series, she was previously in love with David, a man much older than her, who does not exist in the book. Buka would later fall in love with her husband.
 In the series, Blanki saves Marko from getting executed by causing him diabetes complications by sending him a sweetened rice pudding. In the novel, she simply helps him get away from the Ustaše jail.
 In the series, Blanki senses her mother's death and suddenly abandons a dinner with Marko and some friends; while in the novel, there are no details on how Estera died.
 In the series, the Salom family initially lives in house with a large garden. In the book, they lived in an apartment.

Broadcasting

Sequel 
The sequel series to The Scent of Rain in the Balkans, The Blossom of Linden in the Balkans, premiered in late 2011. The series was filmed in Belgrade, and it was directed by Ivan Stefanović. The Blossom of Linden in the Balkans stars Nataša Ninković, Vojin Ćetković, Paulina Manov, Vanja Milačić, Slobodan Ćustić and others.

References

External links 
 
 

2010 Serbian television series debuts
2011 Serbian television series endings
Serbian drama television series
Television shows based on novels
2010s Serbian television series
Television shows set in Belgrade
Television shows filmed in Belgrade
Judaeo-Spanish-language television shows
Radio Television of Serbia original programming